Genealogy registers of families, maintained by Brahmin Pandits known locally as ‘Pandas’, who work as professional genealogists, at Haridwar, has been a subject of study for many years. In several cases, these voluminous records known as Vahis (Bahi), have also been used in settling legal cases regarding inheritance or property disputes, as these records are considered sacrosanct both by the pilgrims and the Pandas themselves, and many of these records trace family history, for more than twenty prior generations, stretching across many centuries.

As Haridwar has traditionally been a site for death rites and also Shraaddha amongst Hindus, it soon also became customary for the family pandits to record each visit of the family, along with their gotra, family tree, marriages and members present etc., grouped according to family and home town. And over the centuries, these registers became an important genealogical source for many families, part of splintered families, in tracing their family tree and family history as well, especially after the Partition of India in 1947, and later amongst the Indian diaspora.

Hindu genealogy registers

Some notable places where Shraadhs are performed for the Pitrs are noted below. At these sites, it became customary for the family pandits (priest) to record each visit of the family, along with their gotra, family tree, marriages and members present etc., grouped according to family and home town. Over the centuries, these registers became an important genealogical source for many families, part of splintered families, in tracing their family tree and family history.

Baniya
 Barot (caste)
 Bhats
 Bhat Sikhs
 Kulavruttanta

References

Further reading
 The Hindu world: an encyclopedic survey of Hinduism, by Benjamin Walker, Published by Praeger, 1968.
 Tracing your Asian roots on the Indian subcontinent, By Abi Husainy, 2011-02-17, BBC

External links

Indian genealogy
Death customs
Family registers
Haridwar
Social history of India
Databases in India
Genealogy databases